

History
There are about 300 railway stations in Iran from 1938.
The names of some of these stations are as follows:

 Tehran railway station
 Kermanshah railway station
 Tabriz railway station
 Mashhad railway station
 Istgah-e Rah Ahan-e Shush
 Istgah-e Kuh Pank
 Maragheh City railway station
 Nishapur City railway station
 Arak railway station
 Kerman railway station
 Qazvin railway station
 Meybod Railway Station
 Zahedan railway station
 Khan Muhammad Chah railway station
 Mirjaveh railway station

See also
Islamic Republic of Iran Railways

External links

UN Map
Iran Railway Map

 
Railway stations
Iran
Railway stations